Gerald Niels Lund (born September 12, 1939) was a general authority of the Church of Jesus Christ of Latter-day Saints (LDS Church) from 2002 to 2008. Lund was released as a general authority and member of the church's Second Quorum of the Seventy on October 4, 2008.

Lund is also a popular LDS fiction writer, having written The Work and the Glory series as well as the Kingdom and the Crown series, among other books. He has also written several theological non-fiction works for Latter-Day Saints, including, Hearing the Voice of the Lord: Principles and Patterns of Personal Revelation (2008) and The Coming of the Lord (reprint 2005). Lund and his wife, Lynn, are the parents of seven children. Lund has also written poems that his wife has set to music.

Before becoming a general authority, he worked in the LDS Church Educational System. He served in the church as a stake president, bishop and branch president at the Missionary Training Center (MTC) in Provo, Utah.  Among other assignments during his tenure as a general authority, he lived in Solihull, England for 3 years while serving in an area presidency.

Books 

Novels

Non-fiction

Filmography 
The Work and the Glory (2004)...Writer (based on novel The Pillar of Light) 
The Work and the Glory II: American Zion (2005)...Writer (based on novel Like A Fire is Burning) 
The Work and the Glory III: A House Divided (2006)... Writer (based on novel Truth Will Prevail)

References
"Elder Gerald N. Lund of the Seventy", Ensign, May 2002.

External links 
Grampa Bill's G.A. Pages: Gerald Niels Lund
Biography of Gerald N. Lund
News article about The Work and the Glory III
Deseret Book Biography of Gerald N. Lund

1939 births
American Latter Day Saint writers
20th-century American novelists
21st-century American novelists
American male novelists
Living people
Members of the Second Quorum of the Seventy (LDS Church)
People from Alpine, Utah
People from Fountain Green, Utah
American general authorities (LDS Church)
20th-century American male writers
21st-century American male writers
Latter Day Saints from Utah
20th-century American non-fiction writers
21st-century American non-fiction writers
American male non-fiction writers